Rosello is a village in the Abruzzo region of Italy.

Rosello, Rossello, or Rosselló may also refer to:

Places
Rosselló (comarca), a historical Catalan comarca of Northern Catalonia, now part of France
Rosselló, Lleida, a municipality located in the province of Lleida, Catalonia, Spain
County of Roussillon (Catalan: Rosselló), historical county of the Principality of Catalonia
Roussillon, the Catalan territories annexed by France after the Peace of the Pyrenees

People with the surname
Dave Rosello (born 1950), Puerto Rican former Major League Baseball player
Rossello di Jacopo Franchi (c. 1377 – c. 1456), Italian painter and illuminator
Pedro Rosselló (born 1944), former Governor and former Senator of Puerto Rico
Ricardo Rosselló (born 1979), former Governor of Puerto Rico
Roy Rosselló (born 1971), former member of Menudo
Counts of Rosselló, a list of French counts

See also
Fountain of the Rosello, a fountain of Sassari and Sardinia in Italy